Raul Siem (born 5 June 1973) is an Estonian politician. He served as Minister of Foreign Trade and Information Technology in the second cabinet of Jüri Ratas from 20 April 2020 to 26 January 2021. He is affiliated with the Conservative People's Party of Estonia.

References 

Living people
1973 births
Place of birth missing (living people)
Government ministers of Estonia
21st-century Estonian politicians
Conservative People's Party of Estonia politicians
University of Tartu alumni